Alex Dorrian, CBE (born 1946, Glasgow) is the executive vice-president of Thales Group as of 2006.  In 2002, he was appointed a CBE.

References

External links
Official Thales Group webpage

1946 births
Living people
Businesspeople from Glasgow
Alumni of the University of Strathclyde
Scottish aerospace engineers
Commanders of the Order of the British Empire